Leucolepis is the scientific name of two genera and may refer to:

Leucolepis (butterfly), a genus of butterflies in the family Lycaenidae
Leucolepis (plant), a genus of mosses in the family Mniaceae